Coiling is a method of creating pottery. It has been used to shape clay into vessels for many thousands of years. It is found across the cultures of the world, including Africa, Greece, China, and Native American cultures of New Mexico. Using the coiling technique, it is possible to build thicker or taller walled vessels, which may not have been possible using earlier methods. The technique permits control of the walls as they are built up and allows building on top of the walls to make the vessel look bigger and bulge outward or narrow inward with less danger of collapsing.  To do this, the potter takes a pliable material (usually clay) then rolls it until it forms a coil, or long pliable cylinder. By placing one coil on top of another, different shapes can be formed.  As this is done while the clay is still fresh and soft, individual coils can be joined seamlessly with simple pressure, rather than by scoring and/or applying slip to the surface. Optionally, coils may only be joined internally or externally, leaving them visible on the other side as an aesthetic choice.

Citations 

 “3.5 Flashcards | Quizlet.” Quizlet. Quizlet, n.d. https://quizlet.com/283553063/35-flash-cards/.
 Alcantar, Zachary. “Creamics Final Ochs Flashcards | Quizlet.” Quizlet. Quizlet, n.d. https://quizlet.com/293553521/ceramics-final-ochs-flash-cards/.
 “Coil ‘Functional’ Bowl/Mug - IHS Ceramics.” IHS Ceramics. Weebly, n.d. https://ihsceramics.weebly.com/coil-functional-bowlmug.html.
 Curtis, Julie. “Elaborate Coil Vessels! by Julie Curtis on Prezi.” Prezi. Prezi, n.d. https://prezi.com/7tc1ch3piwrs/elaborate-coil-vessels/.
 “Definition of Coil Weld.” EngineeringsLab. EngineeringsLab, n.d. http://engineeringslab.com/all_engineerings_dictionary_terms/coil-weld.htm.

Pottery